Máximo González and André Sá were the defending champions, but chose to compete in Kitzbühel and Gstaad, respectively, instead.

Martin Kližan and David Marrero won the title, defeating Nikola Mektić and Antonio Šančić in the final, 6–4, 6–2.

Seeds

Draw

Draw

References
 Main Draw

Croatia Open Umag - Singles
2016 Singles
2016 in Croatian tennis